Voronovskaya is a rural locality (a village) in Muravyovskoye Rural Settlement of Velsky District, Arkhangelsk Oblast, Russia. The population was 464 as of 2014. There are 8 streets.

Geography 
Voronovskaya is located on the Vaga River, 4 km north of Velsk (the district's administrative centre) by road. Lukinskaya is the nearest rural locality.

References 

Rural localities in Velsky District